George Berrell (December 16, 1849 – April 20, 1933) was an American actor of both the 19th and early 20th century stage and of the silent film era. He appeared in numerous stage plays as well as more than 50 films over the course of a career that ran from 1850 to 1927. He was born in Philadelphia, Pennsylvania and died in Los Angeles, California.

Selected filmography

 Bound on the Wheel (1915)
 Mountain Justice (1915)
 Lon of Lone Mountain (1915)
 The Three Godfathers (1916)
 The Committee on Credentials (1916)
 The Flashlight (1917)
 The Golden Bullet (1917)
 The Wrong Man (1917)
 Straight Shooting (1917)
 The Lair of the Wolf (1917)
 In for Thirty Days (1919)
 As the Sun Went Down (1919)
 The City of Masks (1920)
 The Dwelling Place of Light (1920)
 The U.P. Trail (1920)
 The Barbarian (1920)
 The Fire Eater (1921)
 Tracks (1922)
 The Grub-Stake (1923)
 The Everlasting Whisper (1925)
 The Sea Beast (1926)
 Hotel Imperial (1927)
 Black Jack (1927)

External links

1849 births
1933 deaths
American male silent film actors
Male actors from Pennsylvania
19th-century American male actors
American male stage actors
20th-century American male actors